Michele Ferrara (born 13 May 1993) is an Italian professional footballer who plays as a centre back for  club Messina.

Club career
After five seasons in Monopoli, on 15 September 2020 Ferrara joined Serie C club Pergolettese.

On 9 August 2022, Ferrara joined Catania in Serie D.

On 11 January 2023, Ferrara returned to Serie C and signed with Messina.

References

External links
 
 

1993 births
Living people
People from Canosa di Puglia
Sportspeople from the Province of Barletta-Andria-Trani
Footballers from Apulia
Italian footballers
Association football defenders
Serie C players
Serie D players
A.S.D. Barletta 1922 players
F.C. Francavilla players
S.S.D. Città di Brindisi players
S.S. Monopoli 1966 players
A.S.D. Sicula Leonzio players
U.S. Pergolettese 1932 players
Catania S.S.D. players
A.C.R. Messina players